Montmagny is a regional county municipality (RCM) in the Chaudière-Appalaches region of Quebec, Canada. Montmagny is the seat. Its neighbouring RCMs are Bellechasse, Les Etchemins, and L'Islet.

This area was named after Charles de Montmagny, a governor of New France.

Subdivisions
There are 14 subdivisions within the RCM:

Cities & Towns (1)
 Montmagny

Municipalities (9)
 Berthier-sur-Mer
 Cap-Saint-Ignace
 Lac-Frontière
 Notre-Dame-du-Rosaire
 Sainte-Euphémie-sur-Rivière-du-Sud
 Sainte-Lucie-de-Beauregard
 Saint-François-de-la-Rivière-du-Sud
 Saint-Just-de-Bretenières
 Saint-Paul-de-Montminy

Parishes (4)
 Saint-Antoine-de-l'Isle-aux-Grues
 Sainte-Apolline-de-Patton
 Saint-Fabien-de-Panet
 Saint-Pierre-de-la-Rivière-du-Sud

Geography
Its territory can be divided into three main geographical areas. The first is constituted of the estuary of the Saint Lawrence River and its islands. Second are the plains, which includes the Saint Lawrence Lowlands, which run from east to west and covers the northern portion of the Montmagny RCM, and is characterized by its arable soils. The Appalachians is the final geographic region of the area, taking up approximately 80% of the area. Mixed forest covers the south of the RCM.

Hydrography
South River and its main tributary, Bras Saint-Nicolas, are two rivers that form the water system that drains into the Saint Lawrence River. To the east of the Notre Dame Mountains, the Daaquam and Northwest Black River feed into the Saint John River of Maine.

Agriculture
Agriculture occupies , mostly in the fertile Saint Lawrence lowlands. In this area, one may also find the highest population density and the main industrial areas. Forestry dominates the southern part of the RCM, which houses several primary industries, a sparse density, and limited arable land. The forested area of the RCM takes up , some 77% of its territory.

Economy
Generally speaking, the primary activity in the northern part of the RCM is agriculture, while forestry dominates the south. The city of Montmagny, which is home to more than half of the population of the RCM, is the economic centre of the region in which many industrial and commercial activities, and even some of the economic activity in the Côte-du-Sud.

The majority of the businesses can be found along a straight line, several kilometres long, on the Saint Lawrence River (Route 132) and along the Trans-Canada Highway. The other part of the region, which is almost 80% of the area, wherein the main activities are forestry, the gathering of raw materials related to wood, and services, is located in the Appalachians. It has developed recently alongside the service and tourism industries.

A significant proportion of income for the inhabitants is ensured by the manufacturing sector. According to statistics from 1996, more than 30% of the population works in these types of industries. As a whole, the industrial sector is dominated by refineries and traditional manufacturing. Therefore, jobs are concentrated in the areas of wood, furniture, metalworking, textiles, agriculture, and printing.

Agriculture plays a significant role in the economic development of the RCM. Even though it takes up less than 10% of the population of the territory, this industry generates income higher than $38 million per year in the region.

Finally, the tertiary industries take up more than 2/3 of the workers in the RCM. Wholesale and retail stores are at the forefront of the region's economic activity. Lodging, restaurants, business services, and commercial/personal services, such as health and social services, employ many people of the region.

Transportation

Access Routes
Highways and numbered routes that run through the municipality, including external routes that start or finish at the county border:

 Autoroutes
 

 Principal Highways
 

 Secondary Highways
 
 
 
 

 External Routes
 None

See also
 List of regional county municipalities and equivalent territories in Quebec

References

External links
 MRC de Montmagny  (in French)

 
Quebec City Area